Craig Mitchell may refer to:

 Craig Mitchell (actor) (born 1964), American character actor and comedian
 Craig Mitchell (baseball) (born 1954), former Major League Baseball pitcher
 Craig Mitchell (rugby player) (born 1986), Wales international rugby union player
 Craig Mitchell (footballer) (born 1985), English footballer